The Porchabella Glacier (Romansh: Vadret da Porchabella) is a 2.5 km long glacier (2005) in the Albula Range in the canton of Graubünden in Switzerland. In 1973 it had an area of 2.58 km2.

The glacier lies at the foot of Piz Kesch and Piz Val Müra. It gives birth to the river Ava da Salect which ends in the Albula.

Human remains
In 1988, the remains of a presumed dairymaid were discovered and completely unearthed in 1992. Only they shoulders and left arm were mummified, although the rest of the skeleton was fully intact.  Examination concluded that the remains dated from around 1700, and the woman being around twenty-two at the time of her death.

See also
List of glaciers in Switzerland
Swiss Alps

References

External links
Swiss glacier monitoring network

Glaciers of Graubünden